The American Cinema Editors Award for Best Edited Documentary – Feature is one of the annual awards given by the American Cinema Editors, awarded to what members of the  American Cinema Editors Guild deem as the best edited feature documentary film for a given year. Until 2013, this category included television documentaries, both single films and episodes of documentary series. 

This award has been a good indicator of the winners and nominees for the Academy Award for Best Film Editing as in the case of Hoop Dreams.

Winners and nominees
 ‡ – indicates a nomination for the Academy Award for Best Film Editing.

1970s
Best Edited Documentary (Feature or Television)

Best Edited Documentary

1980s

1990s

Best Edited Documentary Film

2000s

Best Edited Documentary

2010s

Best Edited Documentary - Feature

2020s

References

External links
 

American Cinema Editors Awards
Awards established in 1972
Documentary film awards